A.I. Artificial Intelligence (or simply A.I.) is a 2001 American science fiction film directed by Steven Spielberg. The screenplay by Spielberg and screen story by Ian Watson were based on the 1969 short story "Supertoys Last All Summer Long" by Brian Aldiss. Set in a futuristic post-climate change society, the film stars Haley Joel Osment as David, a childlike android uniquely programmed with the ability to love. Jude Law, Frances O'Connor, Brendan Gleeson, and William Hurt star in supporting roles.

Development of A.I. originally began after producer/director Stanley Kubrick acquired the rights to Aldiss' story in the early 1970s. Kubrick hired a series of writers, including Brian Aldiss, Bob Shaw, Ian Watson, and Sara Maitland, until the mid-1990s. The film languished in development hell for years, partly because Kubrick felt that computer-generated imagery was not advanced enough to create the David character, whom he believed no child actor would convincingly portray. In 1995, Kubrick handed A.I. to Spielberg, but the film did not gain momentum until Kubrick died in 1999. Spielberg remained close to Watson's treatment for the screenplay, and dedicated the film to Kubrick.

A.I. Artificial Intelligence was released on June 29, 2001 by Warner Bros. Pictures in North America and by DreamWorks Pictures internationally. It received generally positive reviews from critics and grossed approximately $235 million against a budget of $90–100 million. It was also nominated for Best Visual Effects and Best Original Score (for John Williams) at the 74th Academy Awards. In a 2016 BBC poll of 177 critics around the world, A.I. Artificial Intelligence was voted the eighty-third greatest film since 2000.

Plot

In the 22nd century, rising sea levels from global warming have wiped out coastal cities, reducing the world's population. Mecha humanoid robots, seemingly capable of complex thought but lacking in emotions, have been created.

In Madison, New Jersey, David, a prototype Mecha child capable of experiencing love, is given to Henry Swinton and his wife Monica, whose son Martin contracted a rare disease and has been placed in suspended animation. Monica initially feels uneasy with David, but eventually warms to him and activates his imprinting protocol, causing him to have an enduring, childlike love for her. David seeks to have Monica express the same love towards him, and also befriends Teddy, Martin's robotic teddy bear. Martin is unexpectedly cured of his disease and brought home. Martin becomes jealous of David and goads him to perform worrisome acts, such as cutting off the locks of Monica's hair while she is sleeping. At a pool party, one of Martin's friends pokes David with a knife, triggering his self-protection programming. David grabs onto Martin, and they both fall to the bottom of the pool, with David holding Martin tightly. Others jump in and save Martin before he drowns, and David is accused of being a danger to living people. Henry convinces Monica to return David to his creators to be destroyed, thinking that if David can love, he also can hate. On the way there, Monica has a change of heart and spares David from destruction by leaving him in the woods. With Teddy as his only companion, David recalls The Adventures of Pinocchio and decides to find the Blue Fairy so that she may turn him into a real boy, which he believes will win back Monica's love.

David and Teddy are captured by a "Flesh Fair", a traveling circus-like event where obsolete Mecha are destroyed before jeering crowds who hate Mecha, believing them to be both dangerous and a cause of human unemployment. About to be destroyed himself, David pleads for his life, and the audience, deceived by David's realistic nature, revolts and allows David to escape alongside Gigolo Joe, a male prostitute Mecha on the run from authorities after being framed for murder. David, Teddy, and Joe go to the decadent resort town of Rouge City, where "Dr. Know", a holographic answer engine, directs them to the top of Rockefeller Center in the flooded ruins of Manhattan and also provides fairy tale information interpreted by David as suggesting that a Blue Fairy has the power to help him. Above the ruins of Manhattan, David meets Professor Hobby, his creator, who tells him that their meeting demonstrates David's ability to love and desire. David finds many copies of himself, including female variants called "Darlene", boxed and ready to be shipped. Disheartened by his lost sense of individuality, David attempts suicide by falling from a skyscraper into the ocean. While underwater, David catches sight of a figure resembling the Blue Fairy before Joe rescues him in an amphibious aircraft. Before David can explain, Joe is captured via electromagnet by authorities. David and Teddy take control of the aircraft to see the Blue Fairy, which turns out to be a statue from an attraction on Coney Island. The two become trapped when the Wonder Wheel falls on their vehicle. Believing the Blue Fairy to be real, David asks the statue to turn him into a real boy and repeats this request until his power source is depleted.

Two thousand years later, humanity has become extinct and Manhattan is now buried under glacial ice. Mecha have evolved into an advanced form, and a group of them called the Specialists have become interested in learning about humanity. They find and revive David and Teddy. David walks to the frozen Blue Fairy statue, which collapses when he touches it. The Specialists reconstruct the Swinton family home from David's memories and explain to him, via an interactive image of the Blue Fairy, that it is impossible to make David a real boy. However, at David's insistence, they use their scientific knowledge to recreate Monica through genetic material from the strand of hair that Teddy kept. This Monica can live for only one day, and the process cannot be repeated. David spends his happiest day with Monica, and as she falls asleep in the evening, she tells David that she has always loved him: "the everlasting moment he had been waiting for", the narrator says; "David falls asleep as well and goes to that place 'where dreams are born.'"

Cast

 Haley Joel Osment as David. Osment was Spielberg's first and only choice for the role. To portray the character, Osment avoided blinking his eyes and "programmed" himself with good posture.
 Frances O'Connor as Monica Swinton
 Sam Robards as Henry Swinton
 Jude Law as Gigolo Joe. To prepare for the role, Law studied the acting of Fred Astaire and Gene Kelly, whose movements Joe emulates.
 Jake Thomas as Martin Swinton
 William Hurt as Professor Allen Hobby
 Brendan Gleeson as Flesh Fair impresario Lord Johnson-Johnson
 Jack Angel as Teddy (voice)
 Ken Leung, Matt Winston, Eugene Osment and Clark Gregg as Cybertronics Corp employees
 April Grace as Female Colleague
 Enrico Colantoni as The Murderer
 Paula Malcomson as Patricia in Mirrored Room
 Ashley Scott as Gigolo Jane
 Kathryn Morris as Teenage Honey
 Adrian Grenier as Teen in Van
 Robin Williams as Dr. Know (voice)
 Ben Kingsley as Specialist (voice)
 Meryl Streep as the Blue Fairy (voice)
 Chris Rock as Comedian Robot (voice)
 Erik Bauersfeld as Gardener (voice)
 Ministry as Flesh Fair band

Production

Development
Kubrick began development on an adaptation of "Super-Toys Last All Summer Long" in the late 1970s, hiring the story's author, Brian Aldiss, to write a film treatment. In 1985, Kubrick asked Steven Spielberg to direct the film, with Kubrick producing. Warner Bros. agreed to co-finance A.I. and cover distribution duties. The film labored in development hell, and Aldiss was fired by Kubrick over creative differences in 1989. Bob Shaw briefly served as writer, leaving after six weeks due to Kubrick's demanding work schedule, and Ian Watson was hired as the new writer in March 1990. Aldiss later remarked, "Not only did the bastard fire me, he hired my enemy [Watson] instead." Kubrick handed Watson The Adventures of Pinocchio for inspiration, calling A.I. "a picaresque robot version of Pinocchio".

Three weeks later, Watson gave Kubrick his first story treatment, and concluded his work on A.I. in May 1991 with another treatment of 90 pages. Gigolo Joe was originally conceived as a G.I. Mecha, but Watson suggested changing him to a male prostitute. Kubrick joked, "I guess we lost the kiddie market." Meanwhile, Kubrick dropped A.I. to work on a film adaptation of Wartime Lies, feeling computer animation was not advanced enough to create the David character. After the release of Spielberg's Jurassic Park, with its innovative computer-generated imagery, it was announced in November 1993 that production of A.I. would begin in 1994. Dennis Muren and Ned Gorman, who worked on Jurassic Park, became visual effects supervisors, but Kubrick was displeased with their previsualization, and with the expense of hiring Industrial Light & Magic.

Pre-production
In early 1994, the film was in pre-production with Christopher "Fangorn" Baker as concept artist, and Sara Maitland assisting on the story, which gave it "a feminist fairy-tale focus". Maitland said that Kubrick never referred to the film as A.I., but as Pinocchio. Chris Cunningham became the new visual effects supervisor. Some of his unproduced work for A.I. can be seen on the DVD, The Work of Director Chris Cunningham. Aside from considering computer animation, Kubrick also had Joseph Mazzello do a screen test for the lead role. Cunningham helped assemble a series of "little robot-type humans" for the David character. "We tried to construct a little boy with a movable rubber face to see whether we could make it look appealing," producer Jan Harlan reflected. "But it was a total failure, it looked awful." Hans Moravec was brought in as a technical consultant. Meanwhile, Kubrick and Harlan thought A.I. would be closer to Steven Spielberg's sensibilities as director. Kubrick handed the position to Spielberg in 1995, but Spielberg chose to direct other projects, and convinced Kubrick to remain as director. The film was put on hold due to Kubrick's commitment to Eyes Wide Shut (1999).

After Kubrick's death in March 1999, Harlan and Christiane Kubrick approached Spielberg to take over the director's position. By November 1999, Spielberg was writing the screenplay based on Watson's 90-page story treatment. It was his first solo screenplay credit since Close Encounters of the Third Kind (1977). Pre-production was briefly halted during February 2000, because Spielberg pondered directing other projects, which were Harry Potter and the Philosopher's Stone, Minority Report, and Memoirs of a Geisha. The following month Spielberg announced that A.I. would be his next project, with Minority Report as a follow-up. When he decided to fast track A.I., Spielberg brought Chris Baker back as concept artist. Ian Watson reported that the final script was very faithful to Kubrick's vision, even the ending, which is often attributed to Spielberg, saying, "The final 20 minutes are pretty close to what I wrote for Stanley, and what Stanley wanted, faithfully filmed by Spielberg without added schmaltz."

Filming
The original start date was July 10, 2000, but filming was delayed until August. Aside from a couple of weeks shooting on location in Oxbow Regional Park in Oregon, A.I. was shot entirely using sound stages at Warner Bros. Studios and the Spruce Goose Dome in Long Beach, California.
Spielberg copied Kubrick's obsessively secretive approach to filmmaking by refusing to give the complete script to cast and crew, banning press from the set, and making actors sign confidentiality agreements. Social robotics expert Cynthia Breazeal served as technical consultant during production. Costume designer Bob Ringwood studied pedestrians on the Las Vegas Strip for his influence on the Rouge City extras. Additional visual effects such as removing the visible rods controlling Teddy and removing Haley Joel Osment's breath, were provided in-house by PDI/DreamWorks.

Casting
Julianne Moore and Gwyneth Paltrow were considered for the role of Monica Swinton before Frances O'Connor was cast and Jerry Seinfeld was originally considered to voice and play the Comedian Robot before Chris Rock was cast.

Soundtrack

The film's soundtrack was released by Warner Sunset Records in 2001. The original score was composed and conducted by John Williams and featured singers Lara Fabian on two songs and Josh Groban on one. The film's score also had a limited release as an official "For your consideration Academy Promo", as well as a complete score issue by La-La Land Records in 2015. The band Ministry appears in the film playing the song "What About Us?" but the song does not appear on the official soundtrack album.

Release

Marketing
Warner Bros. used an alternate reality game titled The Beast to promote the film. Over forty websites were created by Atomic Pictures in New York City (kept online at Cloudmakers.org) including the website for Cybertronics Corp. There were to be a series of video games for the Xbox video game console that followed the storyline of The Beast, but they went undeveloped. To avoid audiences mistaking A.I. for a family film, no action figures were created, although Hasbro released a talking Teddy following the film's release in June 2001.

A.I. premiered at the Venice Film Festival in 2001.

Home media
A.I. Artificial Intelligence was released on VHS and DVD in the U.S. by DreamWorks Home Entertainment on March 5, 2002 in widescreen and full-screen 2-disc special editions featuring an extensive sixteen-part documentary detailing the film's development, production, music and visual effects. The bonus features also included interviews with Haley Joel Osment, Jude Law, Frances O'Connor, Steven Spielberg, and John Williams, two teaser trailers for the film's original theatrical release and an extensive photo gallery featuring production stills and Stanley Kubrick's original storyboards. It was released overseas by Warner Home Video.

The film was first released on Blu-ray in Japan by Warner Home Video on December 22, 2010, followed shortly after with a U.S release by Paramount Home Media Distribution (former owners of the DreamWorks catalog) on April 5, 2011. This Blu-ray featured the film newly remastered in high-definition and incorporated all the bonus features previously included on the 2-disc special-edition DVD. Warner Home Video currently owns the digital rights to the film worldwide. Because of the regional distribution, A.I. Artificial Intelligence can be streamed on HBO Max in North America and Paramount+ internationally.

Box office
The film opened in 3,242 theaters in the United States and Canada on June 29, 2001, earning $29.35 million at #1 during its opening weekend. A.I went on to gross $78.62 million in the U.S. and Canada. Opening on 524 screens in Japan, A.I. grossed almost 2 billion Yen in its first five days, the biggest June opening ever in Japan at the time, and sold more tickets in its opening weekend than Star Wars: Episode I – The Phantom Menace, although grossed slightly less. It went on to gross $78 million in Japan. It grossed $79 million in other countries, for a worldwide total of $235.93 million.

Reception
On Rotten Tomatoes, A.I. Artificial Intelligence holds an approval rating of 75% based on reviews from 197 critics, with an average rating of 6.60/10. The website's critical consensus reads, "A curious, not always seamless, amalgamation of Kubrick's chilly bleakness and Spielberg's warm-hearted optimism. A.I. is, in a word, fascinating." On Metacritic, it has a weighted average score of 65 out of 100 based on reviews from 32 critics, which indicates "generally favorable reviews". Audiences surveyed by CinemaScore gave the film an average grade of "C+" on an A+ to F scale.

Producer Jan Harlan stated that Kubrick "would have applauded" the final film, while Kubrick's widow Christiane also enjoyed A.I. Brian Aldiss admired the film as well: "I thought what an inventive, intriguing, ingenious, involving film this was. There are flaws in it and I suppose I might have a personal quibble but it's so long since I wrote it." Of the film's ending, he wondered how it might have been had Kubrick directed the film: "That is one of the 'ifs' of film history—at least the ending indicates Spielberg adding some sugar to Kubrick's wine. The actual ending is overly sympathetic and moreover rather overtly engineered by a plot device that does not really bear credence. But it's a brilliant piece of film and of course it's a phenomenon because it contains the energies and talents of two brilliant filmmakers." Richard Corliss heavily praised Spielberg's direction, as well as the cast and visual effects.

Roger Ebert gave the film three stars out of a possible four, saying that it is "wonderful and maddening". Ebert later gave the film a full four stars and added it to his "Great Movies" list in 2011. Leonard Maltin, on the other hand, gives the film two stars out of four in his Movie Guide, writing: "[The] intriguing story draws us in, thanks in part to Osment's exceptional performance, but takes several wrong turns; ultimately, it just doesn't work. Spielberg rewrote the adaptation Stanley Kubrick commissioned of the Brian Aldiss short story 'Super Toys Last All Summer Long'; [the] result is a curious and uncomfortable hybrid of Kubrick and Spielberg sensibilities." However, he calls John Williams' music score "striking". Jonathan Rosenbaum compared A.I. to Solaris (1972), and praised both "Kubrick for proposing that Spielberg direct the project and Spielberg for doing his utmost to respect Kubrick's intentions while making it a profoundly personal work." Film critic Armond White, of the New York Press, praised the film noting that "each part of David's journey through carnal and sexual universes into the final eschatological devastation becomes as profoundly philosophical and contemplative as anything by cinema's most thoughtful, speculative artists – Borzage, Ozu, Demy, Tarkovsky." Filmmaker Billy Wilder hailed A.I. as "the most underrated film of the past few years." When British filmmaker Ken Russell saw the film, he wept during the ending.

Screenwriter Ian Watson has speculated, "Worldwide, A.I. was very successful (and the 4th-highest earner of the year) but it didn't do quite so well in America, because the film, so I'm told, was too poetical and intellectual in general for American tastes. Plus, quite a few critics in America misunderstood the film, thinking for instance that the Giacometti-style beings in the final 20 minutes were aliens (whereas they were robots of the future who had evolved themselves from the robots in the earlier part of the film) and also thinking that the final 20 minutes were a sentimental addition by Spielberg, whereas those scenes were exactly what I wrote for Stanley and exactly what he wanted, filmed faithfully by Spielberg."

Mick LaSalle gave a largely negative review. "A.I. exhibits all its creators' bad traits and none of the good. So we end up with the structureless, meandering, slow-motion endlessness of Kubrick combined with the fuzzy, cuddly mindlessness of Spielberg." Dubbing it Spielberg's "first boring movie", LaSalle also believed the robots at the end of the film were aliens, and compared Gigolo Joe to the "useless" Jar Jar Binks, yet praised Robin Williams for his portrayal of a futuristic Albert Einstein. Peter Travers gave a mixed review, concluding "Spielberg cannot live up to Kubrick's darker side of the future.", but still put the film on his top ten list that year. David Denby in The New Yorker criticized A.I. for not adhering closely to his concept of the Pinocchio character. Spielberg responded to some of the criticisms of the film, stating that many of the "so called sentimental" elements of A.I., including the ending, were in fact Kubrick's and the darker elements were his own. However, Sara Maitland, who worked on the project with Kubrick in the 1990s, claimed that one of the reasons Kubrick never started production on A.I. was because he had a hard time making the ending work. James Berardinelli found the film "consistently involving, with moments of near-brilliance, but far from a masterpiece. In fact, as the long-awaited 'collaboration' of Kubrick and Spielberg, it ranks as something of a disappointment." Of the film's highly debated finale, he claimed, "There is no doubt that the concluding 30 minutes are all Spielberg; the outstanding question is where Kubrick's vision left off and Spielberg's began." John Simon of the National Review described A.I. "as an uneasy mix of trauma and treacle".

In 2002, Spielberg told film critic Joe Leydon that "People pretend to think they know Stanley Kubrick, and think they know me, when most of them don't know either of us". "And what's really funny about that is, all the parts of A.I. that people assume were Stanley's were mine. And all the parts of A.I. that people accuse me of sweetening and softening and sentimentalizing were all Stanley's. The teddy bear was Stanley's. The whole last 20 minutes of the movie was completely Stanley's. The whole first 35, 40 minutes of the film—all the stuff in the house—was word for word, from Stanley's screenplay. This was Stanley's vision." "Eighty percent of the critics got it all mixed up. But I could see why. Because, obviously, I've done a lot of movies where people have cried and have been sentimental. And I've been accused of sentimentalizing hard-core material. But in fact it was Stanley who did the sweetest parts of A.I., not me. I'm the guy who did the dark center of the movie, with the Flesh Fair and everything else. That's why he wanted me to make the movie in the first place. He said, 'This is much closer to your sensibilities than my own. He also added: "While there was divisiveness when A.I. came out, I felt that I had achieved Stanley's wishes, or goals."

Upon re-watching the film many years after its release, BBC film critic Mark Kermode apologized to Spielberg in an interview in January 2013 for "getting it wrong" on the film when he first viewed it in 2001. He now believes the film to be Spielberg's "enduring masterpiece".

Accolades
Visual effects supervisors Dennis Muren, Stan Winston, Michael Lantieri, and Scott Farrar were nominated for the Academy Award for Best Visual Effects, while John Williams was nominated for Best Original Music Score. A.I. Artificial Intelligence lost to The Lord of the Rings: The Fellowship of the Ring in both categories. Steven Spielberg, Jude Law and Williams received nominations at the 59th Golden Globe Awards. A.I. was successful at the Saturn Awards, winning five awards, including Best Science Fiction Film along with Best Writing for Spielberg and Best Performance by a Younger Actor for Osment.

American Film Institute nominated the film in AFI's 100 Years of Film Scores

Notes

References

Further reading

External links

 
 Official Warner Bros. Site
 
 
 
 

2001 films
2001 science fiction films
2000s science fiction drama films
2000s dystopian films
Amblin Entertainment films
American robot films
American science fiction drama films
Android (robot) films
Climate change films
DreamWorks Pictures films
2000s English-language films
Films about artificial intelligence
Films about families
Films based on short fiction
Films directed by Steven Spielberg
Puppet films
Films produced by Bonnie Curtis
Films produced by Kathleen Kennedy
Films produced by Steven Spielberg
Films scored by John Williams
Films set in the 22nd century
Films set in Manhattan
Films set in New Jersey
Films shot in Los Angeles
Films shot in Oregon
Pinocchio films
American post-apocalyptic films
Films with screenplays by Steven Spielberg
Films about sentient toys
Stanley Kubrick
Warner Bros. films
2001 drama films
2000s American films